, officially known as , is a convention and exhibition center in Suminoe-ku, Osaka, Osaka Prefecture, Japan. The center is located on the Business Creation and Information Transmission Zone of Cosmosquare District in Sakishima Island, a planned business exchange and trading district in Osaka Bay area.

With 72,978 square meters of exhibition area, the venue ranks third in the nation, behind Tokyo Big Sight and Makuhari Messe in terms of total exhibition space. The abbreviation "INTEX" stands for "INTernational EXhibition center."

Principal events
Osaka Auto Messe
Osaka Motor Show – Held around December every other year in odd years
Pokémon Festa
Dōjinshi Sokubaikai
Sibos 2012 – Held on October 29 – November 1, 2012
2019 G20 Osaka Summit – Held on June 28–29, 2019

External links
"INTEX OSAKA" Official site in English
"Osaka Bay Area MICE" Official site in English

Convention centers in Japan
Tourist attractions in Osaka
Buildings and structures in Osaka
Event venues established in 1985
1985 establishments in Japan